Pressley Harvin III (born September 17, 1998) is an American football punter for the Pittsburgh Steelers of the National Football League (NFL). He played college football at Georgia Tech, where he received unanimous All-American honors and won the Ray Guy Award as the nation's top collegiate punter as a senior. He was drafted by the Steelers in the seventh round of the 2021 NFL Draft.

Early life and high school
Harvin was born and grew up in Alcolu, South Carolina. As a youth, he played football as an offensive lineman and volunteered to become the punter for his middle school team in seventh grade. Harvin attended Sumter High School, where he became the Gamecocks' varsity punter as a freshman and also played tight end. As a senior, he punted for an average of 42.5 yards and was named All-State for a second straight season. Harvin also was a member of Sumter's track and field team as a thrower and placed second in shot put and fourth in discus in the South Carolina Class 5A State Championship as a senior.

College career
Harvin became Georgia Tech's starting punter as a true freshman and led all Division I freshmen with 44.1 yards per punt and was named third team All-Atlantic Coast Conference (ACC). As a sophomore, Harvin was named second team All-ACC. He punted for 3,583 yards on 80 punts for an average of 44.8 yards in his junior season. As a senior, Harvin punted 45 times for an average of 48.0 yards, breaking both the school and ACC record, and was named first team All-ACC. He was also a unanimous first team All-America selection and won the Ray Guy Award as the nation's top collegiate punter, becoming the first African American player to win the award.

Professional career

Harvin was selected in the seventh round with the 254th overall pick of the 2021 NFL Draft by the Pittsburgh Steelers. On May 15, 2021, Harvin signed his four-year rookie contract with Pittsburgh. He was named the team's punter during training camp, beating out incumbent Jordan Berry. Harvin made his NFL debut in the Steelers season opener against the Buffalo Bills September 12, 2021, punting five times for 207 yards in a 23–16 win.

References

External links
Pittsburgh Steelers bio
Georgia Tech Yellow Jackets bio

1998 births
Living people
American football punters
Georgia Tech Yellow Jackets football players
People from Clarendon County, South Carolina
Players of American football from South Carolina
All-American college football players
African-American players of American football
Pittsburgh Steelers players
21st-century African-American sportspeople